USS Capitaine (SS/AGSS-336), a Balao-class submarine, was a ship of the United States Navy named for the capitaine, a brilliantly colored fish inhabiting waters of the Atlantic Ocean from North Carolina to Panama.

Construction and commissioning

Capitaine (SS-336) was launched 1 October 1944 by Electric Boat Co., Groton, Conn.; sponsored by Mrs. J. A. Rondomanski; commissioned 26 January 1945, Lieutenant Commander E. S. Friedrick in command; and assigned to the Pacific Fleet.

United States Navy

World War II
Capitaine got underway from New London 7 March 1945 to arrive at Pearl Harbor 15 April. On 6 May, she cleared for her first war patrol, off the coast of French Indochina north of Saigon. Enemy targets were disappointingly few for a new submarine, for the Navy had almost completely swept the sea of Japanese shipping by this time.

On 16 June, she rescued from the sea five Japanese survivors of a merchant ship previously sunk by other forces. After refueling at Subic Bay, Capitaine continued her patrol south of Borneo in the Java Sea. On 30 June, she joined  in a concerted gun attack on five small enemy craft, one (Bandai Maru) which she sank after its crew had abandoned it.

Refitted at Fremantle submarine base, Western Australia, Capitaine sailed for her second war patrol, arriving in her assigned area just three days before hostilities ended.

Post-war
She returned to the west coast in September 1945, but in January 1946 was bound for the Far East once more, training in Philippine waters through March. A month of operations at Pearl Harbor preceded her return to San Diego, from which, after an overhaul, she made two simulated war patrols in 1947 and 1948, and conducted local training and services. The submarine was decommissioned and placed in reserve at Mare Island Naval Shipyard 10 February 1950.

Capitaine was recommissioned 23 February 1957, and reported to the Pacific Fleet a month later. From her base at San Diego, she took part in training, served other fleet units as target in antisubmarine exercises, and training reservists, as well as voyaging to the Far East for 7th Fleet duty, through 1960. On 1 July 1960 Capitaine was reclassified an Auxiliary Research Submarine, AGSS-336.

In 1964 Capitaine took part in the movie In Harm's Way.

Honors and awards
 Asiatic-Pacific Campaign Medal with one battle star for World War II service
 Navy Occupation Service Medal with "ASIA" clasp

Italian Navy 
Capitaine  was decommissioned, 4 March 1966 and transferred (loaned) to Italy, 5 March 1966, where she was recommissioned in the Italian Navy as Alfredo Cappellini (S 507). She was sold to Italy and struck from the US Naval Register, 5 December 1977, and disposed of.

Fiction related to Capitaine 
The fictional submarine USS Triggerfish in the 1951 movie Submarine Command has Capitaines hull number (SS-336).

References

External links 

Balao-class submarines
Ships built in Groton, Connecticut
1944 ships
World War II submarines of the United States
Cold War submarines of the United States
Balao-class submarines of the Italian Navy